Büyükdamlacık is a village in the District of Şereflikoçhisar, Ankara Province, Turkey. The village is populated by Kurds.

References

Villages in Şereflikoçhisar District

Kurdish settlements in Ankara Province